Croke Rovers GAA is a juvenile Gaelic Athletic Association club based in the North West of County Cork, Ireland. The club competes in Duhallow competitions. The club was formed from an amalgamation of players from Kilbrin and Castlemagner clubs and is named after Dr. Thomas Croke, the first patron of the GAA, who was born in Kilbrin and who Croke Park is named after.

Honours
Cork Minor B Hurling Championship (2) 1995, 2011
Duhallow Under-21 Hurling Championship (2) 2012, 2013
Duhallow Under-21 B Football Championship (2) 2014, 2021
Duhallow Minor A Hurling Championship (4) 1991, 1995, 2008, 2009
Duhallow Minor B Hurling Championship (1) 2011
Duhallow Minor A Hurling League (4) 1994, 1995, 1997, 1999
Duhallow Minor A Football Championship (2) 1997, 2008
Duhallow Minor B Football Championship (1) 2003
Duhallow Minor A Football League (1) 1995
Duhallow Minor B Football League (1) 1993
North Cork U16 Hurling Championship (1) 2019
North Cork U16 Hurling League (1) 2019
North Cork U16 Football League (1) 2019

Noted players
 William Egan

See also
 Duhallow GAA
 Kilbrin GAA
 Castlemagner GAA

References

Gaelic games clubs in County Cork
Gaelic football clubs in County Cork